Mashangi (also Romanized as Māshangī and Māshengī) is a village in Mosaferabad Rural District, Rudkhaneh District, Rudan County, Hormozgan Province, Iran. At the 2006 census, its population was 286, in 63 families.

References 

Populated places in Rudan County